Naucleopsis glabra is a South American plant species in the family Moraceae.

The plant is used medicinally by people in parts of the Peruvian Amazon. Its bark is antimicrobial, especially to gram-positive bacteria.

References

glabra
Trees of Brazil
Trees of Peru